Engineering physics, or engineering science, refers to the study of the combined disciplines of physics, mathematics, chemistry, biology, and engineering, particularly computer, nuclear, electrical, electronic, aerospace, materials or mechanical engineering. By focusing on the scientific method as a rigorous basis, it seeks ways to apply, design, and develop new solutions in engineering.

Overview
Unlike traditional engineering disciplines, engineering science/physics is not necessarily confined to a particular branch of science, engineering or physics. Instead, engineering science/physics is meant to provide a more thorough grounding in applied physics for a selected specialty such as optics, quantum physics, materials science, applied mechanics, electronics, nanotechnology, microfabrication, microelectronics, computing, photonics, mechanical engineering, electrical engineering, nuclear engineering, biophysics, control theory, aerodynamics, energy, solid-state physics, etc. It is the discipline devoted to creating and optimizing engineering solutions through enhanced understanding and integrated application of mathematical, scientific, statistical, and engineering principles. The discipline is also meant for cross-functionality and bridges the gap between theoretical science and practical engineering with emphasis in research and development, design, and analysis.

It is notable that in many languages the term for "engineering physics" would be directly translated into English as "technical physics". In some countries, both what would be translated as "engineering physics" and what would be translated as "technical physics" are disciplines leading to academic degrees, with the former specializing in nuclear power research, and the latter closer to engineering physics. In some institutions, an engineering (or applied) physics major is a discipline or specialization within the scope of engineering science, or applied science.

In many universities, engineering science programs may be offered at the levels of B.Tech., B.Sc., M.Sc. and Ph.D. Usually, a core of basic and advanced courses in mathematics, physics, chemistry, and biology forms the foundation of the curriculum, while typical elective areas may include fluid dynamics, quantum physics, economics, plasma physics, relativity, solid mechanics, operations research, quantitative finance, information technology and engineering, dynamical systems, bioengineering, environmental engineering, computational engineering, engineering mathematics and statistics, solid-state devices, materials science, electromagnetism, nanoscience, nanotechnology, energy, and optics.

Whereas typical engineering programs (undergraduate) generally focus on the application of established methods to the design and analysis of engineering solutions in defined fields (e.g. the traditional domains of civil or mechanical engineering), the engineering science programs (undergraduate) focus on the creation and use of more advanced experimental or computational techniques where standard approaches are inadequate (i.e., development of engineering solutions to contemporary problems in the physical and life sciences by applying fundamental principles).

Careers

Qualified engineering physicists, with a degree in Engineering Physics, can work professionally as engineers and/or physicists in the high technology industries and beyond, becoming domain experts in multiple engineering and scientific fields.

Branches

See also
 Applied physics
 Engineering
 Engineering science and mechanics
 Environmental engineering science
 Index of engineering science and mechanics articles

Notes and references
38. https://ughb.stanford.edu/degree-programs/major-programs/engineering-physics-program

External links
"Engineering Physics at Xavier"
"The Engineering Physicist Profession"
"Engineering Physicist Professional Profile"
Society of Engineering Science Inc.
"Weapon Physics and Design Program"

Applied and interdisciplinary physics
physics

ja:基礎工学#『基礎的な工学』としての基礎工学